Walter Micallef u l-Ħbieb is a modern folk sextet from Malta, featuring Walter Micallef on vocals and guitar, Renzo Spiteri on percussion, Jes Psaila on acoustic and electric guitar, Eric Wadge on bass, Pawlu Camilleri on harmonica and Albert Garzia on piano and accordion.

They have given many performances in Malta and on Gozo and all their songs are original and in Maltese, the European Union's smallest official language. On 23 March 2007 they launched the album Ħamsin, that topped the Maltese music charts on its release.

References
 Words with Meaning, Malta Today, 23 March 2001.
 The Chords of Justice, Times of Malta, 18 Jan 2003.
 The Third Degree with Walter Micallef, Malta Today, 16 Feb 2003.
 One World Beat preview, Times of Malta, 13 March 2004.
 Up Close to Walter Micallef, St. James Cavalier Concerts preview, Times of Malta, 3 July 2004.
 Fading Notes, The Malta Independent, 22 August 2005.
 Kull Buffura Riħ, 23 Marzu 2007.
 Music Matters, The Malta Independent, 1 April 2007.
 Everyday songs, The Malta Independent, 21 April 2007.

Maltese musical groups
Musical groups established in 2004